Dajaca is a genus of stick insects belonging to the suborder Verophasmatodea, family Aschiphasmatidae and is the only representative of the monotypic tribe Dajacini.  Species have been recorded from Borneo, Vietnam, Hong Kong and Myanmar.

Species
The Phasmida Species File list the following:
 Dajaca alata (Redtenbacher, 1906)
 Dajaca chani Seow-Choen, 1998
 Dajaca filiformis Bragg, 1992
 Dajaca monilicornis Redtenbacher, 1906 - type species locality Borneo (see specimen)
 Dajaca napolovi Brock, 2000
 Dajaca nigrolineata Hennemann, Conle & Bruckner, 1996
 Dajaca swiae Seow-Choen, 2020
 Dajaca viridipennis Bragg, 2001

References

External links

Phasmatodea genera
Phasmatodea of Asia